The 2007 Rice Owls football team represented Rice University in the 2007 NCAA Division I FBS college football season. The Owls, led by 1st year head coach David Bailiff, played their home games at Rice Stadium in Houston, Texas. Rice finished the season 3–9 and 3–5 in CUSA play.

Schedule

References

Rice
Rice Owls football seasons
Rice Owls football